The sixth season of La Voz aired from January 7, 2019 to April 10, 2019 on Antena 3. Pablo López was the only coach to return from season five. He was joined by Antonio Orozco, who returned after a two-season absence, alongside new coaches Paulina Rubio and Luis Fonsi.

This was La Voz's first season on Antena 3, which acquired the rights to the format after they were dropped by Telecinco.

Teams

  Winner
  Runner-up
  Third Place
  Fourth Place
  Artist was Eliminated in Semifinal
  Artist was Eliminated in Quarterfinal
  Artist was Eliminated in Final Battles Round
  Artist was Stolen in Knockout Round
  Artist was Eliminated in Knockouts Round

Blind Auditions 
The blind auditions aired from January 7, 2019. New to this season, the "Block" button. An additional three new small buttons with the name of other coaches which they can press any of those to stop another coach nabbing the contestant to its team. Each coach can block another coach 3 times for the entire season and the chair of the  blocked coach won't turned around when he/she is blocked.

Episode 1: 7 January 2019

Episode 2: 8 January 2019

Episode 3: 14 January 2019

Episode 4: 15 January 2019

Episode 5: 21 January 2019

Episode 6: 22 January 2019

Episode 7: 28 January 2019

Episode 8: 29 January 2019

Episode 9: 4 February 2019

Episode 10: 5 February 2019

Episode 11: 11 February 2019

Episode 12: 12 February 2019

Knockouts 
Knockout rounds began on February 18. Each team is divided into five and every artist will performing a song of their choice. Two of five contestant is chosen to advance into the Battle Round while the remaining unchosen will have a chance to be stolen by another coaches. Each coach is given two " Steals" to save losing artist.

Episode 13: 18 February 2019

Episode 14: 19 February 2019

Episode 15: 25 February 2019

Episode 16: 26 February 2019

Episode 17: 4 March 2019

Episode 18: 5 March 2019

« Batalla Final » (Final Battle)

Episode 19: 11 March 2019

Episode 20: 12 March 2019

« Directos » (Live Shows)

Episode 21: 20 March 2019 
 Group performances:
 Pablo López, Palomy López & Auba Estela Murillo - "Y sin embargo"
 Luis Fonsi, Linda Rodrigo & Álex Palomo - "Échame la Culpa"
 Antonio Orozco, Lia Kali & Javi Moya - "Temblando"
 Paulina Rubio, Viki Lafuente & Susana Montaña - "Yo No Soy Esa Mujer"

Episode 22: 27 March 2019 
 Group performances:
 Luis Fonsi, Joel Lion & María Espinosa - "Quisiera poder olvidarme de ti"
 Pablo López, Andrés Martín & Javier Erro - "Lo saben mis zapatos"
 Paulina Rubio, Hugo Marlo & Ángel Cortés - "Ni una Sola Palabra"
 Antonio Orozco, Lorena Fernández & Marcelino Damion - "Por pedir, pedí"

Episode 23: 3 April 2019 
 Group performances:
 Paulina Rubio, Viki Lafuente & Ángel Cortés - "Mi Nuevo Vicio"
 Antonio Orozco, Javi Moya & Marcelino Damion - "Mi héroe"
 Pablo López, Andrés Martín & Auba Estela Murillo - "El patio"
 Luis Fonsi, Linda Rodrigo & María Espinosa - "Aquí Estoy Yo"

Episode 24: 10 April 2019

Elimination chart

Overall
Color key
Artist's info

Result details

References

2019 Spanish television seasons
Spain